Bethuel in Hebrew Bible, was an Aramean man, the youngest son of Nahor and Milcah, the nephew of Abraham, and the father of Laban and Rebecca.

Bethuel is a given name. It may also refer to:

Given name
Bethuel Kitchen (1812–1895), nineteenth-century American politician from Virginia and West Virginia
Bethuel Peck (1788–1862), American physician and politician from New York
Bethuel Ushona (born 1982), Namibian boxer
Bethuel M. Webster (1900–1989), American lawyer in New York City

Surname
Fabrice Bethuel (born 1963), French mathematician